This is a list of some of the breeds of sheep considered in Italy to be wholly or partly of Italian origin. Some may have complex or obscure histories, so inclusion here does not necessarily imply that a breed is predominantly or exclusively Italian.

Principal breeds

 Alpagota
 Altamurana
 Appenninica
 Bagnolese
 Barbaresca
 Bergamasca
 Biellese
 Brentegana
 Brianzola
 Brigasca
 Brogna
 Ciavenasca
 Ciuta
 Comisana
 Cornella Bianca
 Cornigliese
 Corteno
 Delle Langhe
 Fabrianese
 Finarda
 Frabosana
 Garessina
 Garfagnina Bianca
 Gentile di Puglia
 Istriana (Carsolina)
 Lamon
 Laticauda
 Leccese
 Livo
 Marrana
 Massese
 Matesina
 Merinizzata Italiana
 Nera di Arbus
 Modenese
 Nostrana
 Noticiana
 Pagliarola
 Pinzirita
 Plezzana
 Pomarancina
 Pusterese
 Quadrella
 Rosset
 Saltasassi
 Sambucana
 Sarda
 Savoiarda
 Schnalserschaf
 Schwarzbraunes Bergschaf
 Sciara
 Sopravissana
 Tacola
 Tiroler Bergschaf
 Trimeticcia Segezia
 Turchessa
 Valle del Belice
 Varesina
 Vicentina
 Villnösser Schaf
 Vissana
 Zerasca
 Zucca Modenese

Minor breeds

The minor sheep breeds of Italy include:

 Barisciano, or Aquilana (Abruzzo)
 Bellunese (Veneto)
 Borgotarese (Emilia-Romagna)
 Cadorina (Veneto)
 Campidano, or Cagliari Sardegna
 Carapellese, or Gentile moretta, Gentile a vello nero, Merino nera, Moretta
 Carnica (Friuli-Venezia Giulia)
 Casciana (Tuscany)
 Casentinese (Tuscany)
 Chersolina
 Chianina, or Val di Chiana (Tuscany)
 Chietina (Lazio)
 Cinta (Lombardy)
 Cornetta (Emilia-Romagna)
 Della Roccia or Steinschaf, Pecora delle rocce, Pecora dei sassi, Carinthia, Tirolese (Trentino-Alto Adige)
 Di montagna
 Fasanese
 Fiemmese, or Val di Fiemme (Trentino-Alto Adige)
 Friulana, or Furlana (Friuli-Venezia Giulia)
 Gentile di Calabria, or Migliorata di Calabria (Calabria)
 Gentile di Lucania, or Migliorata di Lucania (Basilicata)
 Giupanna, or Ragusa-Sipan (Sicily)
 Maremmana, or Bastarda maremmana, Bastarda spagnola (Tuscany, Lazio)
 Noventana, Monselesana, Pecora di Monselice
 Padovana (Veneto)
 Pecora del Jura
 Perugina di pianura (Umbria)
 Reggiana (Emilia-Romagna)
 Sampeyrina
 Senese, or Senese delle Crete (Tuscany)
 Tarina
 Urbascia
 Val Badia, Badiota (Trentino-Alto Adige)
 Varzese

References

 
Sheep